The Itapacurá River is a river in the state of Pará, Brazil. It is a right tributary of the Tapajós, which it enters a few kilometres upstream from Miritituba, on the opposite bank from Itaituba.

The upper part of the river flows through the Trairão National Forest.

References

Rivers of Pará